Georg Fischer (born 10 November 1960 in Kelheim) is a West German cross-country skier and biathlete who competed in the 1980s. He finished seventh in the 4 × 10 km relay at the 1988 Winter Olympics in Calgary.

Cross-country skiing results

Olympic Games

External links

Olympic 4 x 10 km relay results: 1936-2002 

1960 births
Cross-country skiers at the 1988 Winter Olympics
German male cross-country skiers
German male biathletes
Olympic cross-country skiers of West Germany
Living people
Biathlon World Championships medalists
People from Kelheim
Sportspeople from Lower Bavaria
20th-century German people